Stenochariergus hollyae  is a species of beetle in the family Cerambycidae. It was described by Giesbert and Hovore in 1989.

References

Rhinotragini
Beetles described in 1989